Route 301 or Highway 301 could refer to:

Canada
 Manitoba Provincial Road 301
 Newfoundland and Labrador Route 301
 Nova Scotia Route 301
 Prince Edward Island Route 301
 Quebec Route 301
 Saskatchewan Highway 301

China
 China National Highway 301

Costa Rica
 National Route 301

Japan
 Japan National Route 301

Korea, South
 Sangju–Yeongcheon Expressway

Philippines
 N301 highway (Philippines)

United States
  U.S. Route 301 (former)
  U.S. Route 301
  Arkansas Highway 301
  Georgia State Route 301
  Indiana State Road 301
  Iowa Highway 301 (former)
  Kentucky Route 301
  Louisiana Highway 301
  Maryland Route 301
  Minnesota State Highway 301
  Mississippi Highway 301
 New York:
  New York State Route 301
  County Route 301 (Albany County, New York)
  County Route 301 (Erie County, New York)
 County Route 301 (Westchester County, New York)
  North Carolina Highway 301 (former)
  Ohio State Route 301
  Pennsylvania Route 301 (former)
  Tennessee State Route 301
 Texas:
  Texas State Highway 301 (former)
  Texas State Highway Loop 301
  Farm to Market Road 301
  Utah State Route 301
  Virginia State Route 301

Other areas:
  Puerto Rico Highway 301
  U.S. Virgin Islands Highway 301

Film
Highway 301 (film), a 1950 film noir by Andrew L. Stone